C.S.D. Benfica or Clube Sport Dili e Benfica is a football club based in Dili, East Timor.

References

Football clubs in East Timor
Football
Association football clubs established in 1965
Sport in Dili